Howard Hayes Scullard  (9 February 1903 – 31 March 1983) was a British historian specialising in ancient history, notable for editing the Oxford Classical Dictionary and for his many published works.

Scullard's father was Herbert Hayes Scullard, a minister, and his mother Barbara Louisa Dodds.

Born in Bedford, England, his early education was at Highgate School, followed by St. John's College, Cambridge. He was a tutor and then reader at New College London, from 1935 to 1959, when he became Professor of Ancient History at King's College London, retiring in 1970.  He nonetheless remained active in retirement and notably wrote chapters for the re-edition of The Cambridge Ancient History, but his contributions to volumes VII and VIII were published posthumously.

Perhaps his most widely known work is From the Gracchi to Nero: A History of Rome from 133 B.C. to A.D. 68, a text widely used by students studying Rome in the late republic, as well as Rome under the Julio-Claudians.

Books 
Author:
 , a Thirlwall Prize essay.
 , reprinted.
 .
 , reprinted.
 .
 .
 .
 .
 .
 .

Editor:
 , 1939, with H.E. Butler
 .
 .
 , with N.G.L. Hammond.
 , 1975, the 1st edition having come out in 1935.

References

Citations

Bibliography
 Necrology by F.W. Walbank in Proceedings of the British Academy 69, 595–610. 

1903 births
1983 deaths
Academics of King's College London
Alumni of St John's College, Cambridge
English classical scholars
Fellows of the British Academy
Fellows of the Society of Antiquaries of London
Historians of antiquity
People educated at Highgate School
Historians of ancient Rome